The 1920 Isle of Man TT races was the first races to take place following the end of World War I. Official practice sessions started on 31 May with the races taking place on 15 and 17 June 1920.

The 350cc Junior TT race was won by Cyril Williams riding an AJS motor-cycle and the 250cc Lightweight class by R. O. Clark with a Levis machine.  The first post-war Senior TT was won by Tommy de la Hay with a 500c Sunbeam bike.

Races

Junior TT 350cc race
The Junior TT race was initially led by Eric Williams, the winner of the 1914 Junior TT race riding an AJS and set a new Junior lap record of 44 minutes and 6 seconds, an average speed of 51.36 mph. A mechanical retirement for Eric Williams allowed Cyril Williams also riding an AJS to build up an impressive lead of 20 minutes. However, Cyril Williams hit gear-box problems at the Creg-ny-Baa corner on the last lap and free-wheeled and pushed to the finish-line located at the Nobles Park playing fields in the town of Douglas.  The winning margin for Williams was 9 minutes and 50 seconds from Jack Watson-Bourne, riding for Blackburne motorcycles in 4 hours, 37 minutes and 57 seconds, at an average race speed of 40.74 mph.

Lightweight TT 250cc race
The Lightweight class within Junior TT race was won by R. O. Clark riding a Levis and he may have won the event overall but was thrown from his Levis motor-cycle at the Creg-ny-Baa after a puncture on the last lap.  After completing the race on a bent front wheel-rim he was detained in Nobles Hospital after the race with physical exhaustion.

Senior TT 500 race
The Senior TT race was won by Tommy de la Hay riding a Sunbeam at an average race speed of 51.79 mph from local Isle of Man competitor Duggie Brown riding a Norton. A new lap record was set by George Dance riding a Sunbeam of 40 minutes and 43 seconds, an average speed of 55.62 mph. AJS thought they could repeat the success of the 1914 Junior TT with a newly developed  ohv-engined machine. While Cyril Williams won the Junior race for AJS, H. R. Davies, also on the AJS team, retired from both races with engine trouble.

Race awards and classes
The 1920 Junior TT race included for the first time a new Lightweight TT class for motorcycles of 250 cc engine capacity. R. O. Clark riding for the Levis marque finished in 4th place overall and was within the 30 minute limit for The Motor Cycle Cup Trophy for the smaller 250cc motor-cycles.

Race results

Junior TT 350cc

Held on 15 June 1920, at 9:30 am over a distance of 188.75  miles (5 laps of 37.75 miles each), limited to machines of cylinder capacity not exceeding 350cc., with a class for 250 cc. engines run concurrently for The Motor Cycle cup. Out of 32 entries, comprising 8 two-strokes, 16 four-stroke Singles, 7 Flat Twins and 1 V Twin, twenty-four started the race and only eleven finished.

Race results

Junior TT 350cc
Held on June 15, at 9:31 am over a distance of 188.75  miles (5 laps of 37.75 miles each), limited to machines of cylinder capacity not exceeding 350cc., with a class for 250 cc. engines run concurrently for The Motor Cycle cup. Out of 32 entries, comprising 8 two-strokes, 16 four-stroke Singles, 7 Flat Twins and 1 V Twin, twenty-four started the race and only eleven finished.

Senior TT 500cc final standings
Held on June 17, at 9:30 am over a distance of 226.50  miles (6 laps of 37.75 miles each), limited to machines of cylinder capacity not exceeding 500cc. Out of 29 entries, comprising 21 four-stroke singles, 5 V Twins, 3 Flat Twins and no two-strokes. Twenty-seven riders started the race and fourteen finished.
{| class="wikitable" style="width:80%; font-size:85%;"
! style="border: 0;" |  The 9th International Isle of Man Tourist Trophy
|-
| style="background: #f2f2f2; border: 0; text-align: center;" |
{| class="wikitable" style="width:100%;" 
|- bgcolor="#efefef"
!rowspan="2"| Pos
!rowspan="2"| #
!rowspan="2"| Rider
!rowspan="2"| Bike
!rowspan="2"| Cyl.
!colspan="4"| Senior TT race classification
|-
! Laps
! Time
! Speed
! Prizes & Remarks
|-
! align="center"| 1
| align="center"| 66
| align="left"| Tommy de la Hay
| align="left"| 3½ hp Sunbeam  499cc
| align="center"| 1
| align="center"| 6
|4:22.23
|51.79 mph
|align="left"|1st Prize - Winner of Senior Trophy, £50 and a gold medal.
|-
! align="center"| 2
| align="center"| 56
| align="left"| Douglas Brown
| align="left"| 3½ hp Norton  490cc
| align="center"| 1
| align="center"| 6
|4:26.13
|51.05 mph
|align="left"|2nd Prize - £25 and a medal from Manx Motor-Cycle Club.
|-
! align="center"| 3
| align="center"| 70
| align="left"| Reg Brown
| align="left"| 3½ hp Sunbeam  499cc
| align="center"| 1
| align="center"| 6
|4:32.27
|49.88 mph
|align="left"|3rd Prize - £15 and a medal from Manx Motor-Cycle Club. 1st Private entry.'|-
! align="center"| 4
| align="center"| 67| align="left"| Norman Sclater. jun.
| align="left"| 3½ hp Norton  490cc
| align="center"| 1
| align="center"| 6
|4:39.47
|48.57 mph
|align="left"|Gold medal.
|-
! align="center"| 5
| align="center"| 53| align="left"| Reuben Harveyson
| align="left"| 3½ hp Indian Scout 496.8cc
| align="center"| 2
| align="center"| 6
|4:40.25
|48.46 mph
|align="left"|Gold medal. 1st Twin-cylinder machine.
|-
! align="center"| 6
| align="center"| 51| align="left"| Douglas Alexander
| align="left"| 3½ hp Indian Scout 496.8cc
| align="center"| 2
| align="center"| 6
|4:41.25
|48.30 mph
|align="left"|Gold medal. 2nd twin-cylinder machine.
|-
! align="center"| 7
| align="center"| 57| align="left"| Jimmy Shaw
| align="left"| 3½ hp Norton  490cc
| align="center"| 1
| align="center"| 6
|4:51.46
|46.57 mph
|align="left"|Gold medal.
|-
! align="center"| 8
| align="center"| 58| align="left"| Noel H. Brown
| align="left"| 3½ hp Norton  490cc
| align="center"| 1
| align="center"| 6
|4:54.24
|46.16 mph
|align="left"|
|-
! align="center"| 9
| align="center"| 64| align="left"| Frank Townshend
| align="left"| 3½ hp Sunbeam  499cc
| align="center"| 1
| align="center"| 6
|4:54.29
|46.148 mph
|align="left"|
|-
! align="center"| 10
| align="center"| 63| align="left"| Lieut. Charlie North
| align="left"| 3½ hp Norton  490cc
| align="center"| 1
| align="center"| 6
|5:01.05
|45.13 mph
|align="left"| Broken saddle delayed him in the first lap.
|-
! align="center"| 11
| align="center"| 79| align="left"| Norman Black
| align="left"| 3½ hp Norton  490cc
| align="center"| 1
| align="center"| 6
|5:08.26
|44.06 mph
|align="left"|Suffered multiple punctured and belt-stops. Rode last 30 miles with no bearings in the back hub.
|-
! align="center"| 12
| align="center"| 52| align="left"| Freddie Dixon
| align="left"| 3½ hp Indian Scout 496.8cc
| align="center"| 2
| align="center"| 6
|5:17.12
|42.84 mph
|align="left"|
|-
! align="center"| 13
| align="center"| 59| align="left"| Graham Walker
| align="left"| 3½ hp Norton  490cc
| align="center"| 1
| align="center"| 6
|5:24.50
|41.83 mph
|align="left"|
|-
! align="center"| 14
| align="center"| 76| align="left"| Jack Thomas
| align="left"| 3½ hp Norton  490cc
| align="center"| 1
| align="center"| 6
|5:53.21
|38.463 mph
|align="left"|
|-
! align="center"| DNF
|| 75| align="left"| Capt. Alexander Lindsay, M.B.
|align="left"| 3½ hp Norton  490cc
|align="center"| 1
|align="center"| 4
|colspan="4"; align="left" | Retired on lap 5 near Ballaugh. Engine trouble.
|-
! align="center"| DNF
|| 69| align="left"| Bert le Vack
|align="left"| 3½ hp Duzmo  496cc
|align="center"| 1
|align="center"| 4
|colspan="4"; align="left" | Fell on lap 5 near Bungalow. Escaped unhurt.
|-
! align="center"| DNF
|| 61| align="left"| Harold Petty
|align="left"| 3½ hp Norton  490cc
|align="center"| 1
|align="center"| 3
|colspan="4"; align="left" | Dry-skidded on lap 4 at Ramsey. Damaged front fork.
|-
! align="center"| DNF
|| 74| align="left"| Alfred Alexander
|align="left"| 3½ hp Douglas  494cc
|align="center"| 2
|align="center"| 3
|colspan="4"; align="left" | Retired at the end of lap 4 in pits, with belt fastener trouble, after taking 1½ hours for lap 3.
|-
! align="center"| DNF
|| 54| align="left"| Bert Houlding
|align="left"| 3½ hp Indian Scout 496.8cc
|align="center"| 2
|align="center"| 3
|colspan="4"; align="left" | Retired on lap 4. Tyre trouble at Union Mills.
|-
! align="center"| DNF
|| 65| align="left"| George Dance
|align="left"| 3½ hp Sunbeam  499cc
|align="center"| 1
|align="center"| 2
|colspan="4"; align="left" | Retired on lap 3 near Creg-ny-Baa due to broken inlet valve.
|-
! align="center"| DNF
|| 62| align="left"| Victor Horsman
|align="left"| 3½ hp Norton  490cc
|align="center"| 1
|align="center"| 2
|colspan="4"; align="left" | Toured in at the end lap 3 due to partial engine seizure at Bungalow
|-
! align="center"| DNF
|| 55| align="left"| Vivian Olsson
|align="left"| 3½ hp Norton  490cc
|align="center"| 1
|align="center"| 2
|colspan="4"; align="left" | Crashed on lap 3 at Windy Corner, brake gear fouled chain.
|-
! align="center"| DNF
|| 68| align="left"| Tom Simister
|align="left"| 3½ hp Norton  490cc
|align="center"| 1
|align="center"| 2
|colspan="4"; align="left" | Retired on lap 3 at Hillberry due to broken piston.
|-
! align="center"| DNF
|| 68| align="left"| Eric Williams
|align="left"| 3½ hp Sunbeam  499cc
|align="center"| 1
|align="center"| 2
|colspan="4"; align="left" | Dry-skidded on lap 3 into a wooden gate at Quarterbridge due to jammed brake. Escaped unhurt.
|-
! align="center"| DNF
|| 72| align="left"| E.S. Abram
|align="left"| 3 hp ABC  400cc
|align="center"| 2
|align="center"| 1
|colspan="4"; align="left" | Retired on lap 2. Valve trouble at Crosby.
|-
! align="center"| DNF
|| 60| align="left"| Howard R. Davies
|align="left"| 2¾ hp AJS  349cc
|align="center"| 1
|align="center"| 1
|colspan="4"; align="left" | Retired on lap 2. Engine trouble at Kirkmichael.
|-
! align="center"| DNF
|| 78| align="left"| Reg. Lucas
|align="left"| 3 hp ABC  400cc
|align="center"| 2
|align="center"| 0
|colspan="4"; align="left" | Retired on first lap at Ramsey with broken valve
|-
! align="center"| DNS
|| 77| align="left"| S.J. Redmond
|align="left"| 3½ hp Indian Scout 496.8cc
|align="center"| 2
|align="center"| 
|colspan="4"; align="left" | Withdraw during preliminary stages.
|-
! align="center"| DNS
|| 73| align="left"| A.J. Moffat
|align="left"| 3½ hp Norton  490cc
|align="center"| 1
|align="center"| 
|colspan="4"; align="left" | Damaged his machine in practice and was unable to find another.
|-
|colspan=14| Fastest lap''': George Dance, 40min. 43sec. 53.62 mph (New record)|-
|}
|}

Notes
 During the first practice session, T.H. Haddock riding an AJS in the Junior race crashed at Keppel Gate. George Cowley crashed at Governor's Bridge and Graham Walker, riding for Norton in the Senior class, hit sheep in the mist on the Snaefell Mountain section.
 During the Saturday practice D.S. Alexander riding an Indian Scout at number 51 in the Senior turned off the course at Braddan Bridge and rejoined at Hillberry and set a time of 39 minutes and 10 seconds!
 Prize Money awarded for the Junior race was: 1st place £40, 2nd place £20 and 3rd place £10. A gold finisher's award was made for each competitor completing the race within 30 minutes of the winner.  The Motor Cycle'' magazine Gold Cup was awarded to Eric Williams for setting the fastest lap of 44 minutes and 6 seconds.
 Prize Money awarded for the Senior race was: 1st place £50, 2nd place £25 and 3rd place £15.

References

External links
Detailed race results
Isle of Man TT winners

Sources

1920 in British motorsport
1920
Isle